Wanda Bottesi (1923 – 1 September 2018) was an Austrian Righteous Among the Nations. She was born in Innsbruck. In the summer of 1944 she rescued the Jews Lorraine Justman-Visnicki and Mirjam Fuchs from the deportation to a concentration camp. First she took the women to her apartment and hid them for a few weeks. A friend of her, police inspector Anton Dietz, managed to fake documents which declared the women Christian Poles. This way Lorraine Justman-Visnicki and Mirjam Fuchs could survive the war, working as foreign workers. Bottesi died in Innsbruck on 1 September 2018. In November, a tree was planted in her memory in Jerusalem, Israel.

References

External links
 Wanda Bottesi – her activity to save Jews' lives during the Holocaust, at Yad Vashem website
 https://web.archive.org/web/20110609152631/http://www.gedenkdienst.org/deutsch/gerechte/inhalt.php (German)

1923 births
2018 deaths
Austrian Righteous Among the Nations
People from Innsbruck